Kinzer is an unincorporated community in Butler County, in the U.S. state of Missouri.

The community was just south of Missouri Route B (old Route 60) three miles east of Poplar Bluff and was a station on the Missouri Pacific Railroad.

Kinzer was named after Isaac Kinzer, a businessperson in the local lumber industry.

References

Unincorporated communities in Butler County, Missouri
Unincorporated communities in Missouri